The Agency of Religious Moderation and Human Resource Development (Indonesian: Badan Moderasi Beragama dan Pengembangan Sumber Daya Manusia, abbreviated as BMBPSDM) is the supporting unit of the Ministry of Religious Affairs which is responsible for promoting religious moderation dan fostering the development of the ministry's human resource and capabilities in Indonesia. It was formed on 26 January 2023.

History 
The agency is established as a replacement for the Ministry of Religious Affairs' Research, Development, Education, and Training Agency which already integrated with National Research and Innovation Agency (Indonesian: Badan Riset dan Inovasi Nasional, BRIN) as part of the Research Organization for Social Sciences and Humanities (Indonesian: Organisasi Riset Ilmu Pengetahuan Sosial dan Humaniora, ORIPSH) and Research Organization for Archaeology, Language, and Letters (Indonesian: Organisasi Riset Arkeologi, Bahasa, dan Sastra, ORARBASTRA). The integration left only the former agency's Education and Training part to not be integrated into BRIN. Eventually, the Center for Religious Harmony (Indonesian: Pusat Kerukunan Umat Beragama) of the Ministry of Religious Affairs also merged with the remnant of the former Research, Development, Education, and Training Agency. The amalgamation resulted in the formation of the BMBPSDM.

The first head of the agency is Suyitno, a Ministry of Religious Affairs official.

The Nine Measures 
The agency developed the strategic programs and policies for the Ministry's policies known as The Nine Measures on 5 February 2023. The Nine Measures are:

 Acceleration of religious moderation to prevent the misuse of religious teachings for identity politics.
 Advocation of worship places building.
 Community empowerment and development of early warning system for intolerant religious activities and religious conflicts.
 Upgrading the competence and raising the welfare of religious extension officials.
 Acceleration of the halal certification.
 Defending and safeguarding the public satisfaction over Hajj, innovation and optimalization in Waqf certification and social funds monitoring.
 Upgrading in professional capabilities of the Ministry of Religious Affairs employees.
 Acceleration of formulation of the regulations related to the religious services.
 Institutional transformation, status transfer, and independence of religious education institutions.

Religious Intelligence 
Aside from being the promoter of religious harmony, the agency is also projected as one of the intelligence agencies of Indonesia. As an intelligence agency, BMPPSDM will work together with National Counter Terrorism Agency in monitoring religious extremism and intolerant religious activities in Indonesia, providing early warning and intelligence on matters related to religious terrorism, and preventing religious terrorism acts.

References 

Religion in Indonesia
Intelligence agencies
Government agencies of Indonesia
2023 establishments in Indonesia